Mary Howard Schoolcraft (1820 – March 12, 1878) was an American writer, the author of the controversial pro-slavery novel, The Black Gauntlet: A Tale of Plantation Life in South Carolina. She was the second wife of geographer, geologist and ethnologist Henry Schoolcraft.

References

External links

1820 births
1878 deaths
American proslavery activists
19th-century American women writers